Andrew William Saballus (born 1 June 1969 in Hobart, Tasmania), is an Australian cricketer, who played for the Tasmanian Tigers in the 1996–97 season.

See also
 List of Tasmanian representative cricketers

External links

1969 births
Living people
Australian cricketers
Tasmania cricketers
Cricketers from Hobart